Molly & Mobarak is a 2003 Australian documentary directed by Tom Zubrycki.  It follows a Hazara asylum seeker, 22-year-old Mobarak Tahiri, as he falls in love with 25-year-old Molly Rule, and faces possible deportation as his temporary visa nears expiration. In 2003, it was nominated for best documentary at the IF Awards.

External links

2003 films
Australian documentary films
Documentary films about refugees in Australia
Hazara people-related films
2000s English-language films